Attila Záhonyi (born 1 December 1959) is a Hungarian sport shooter. He was born in Budapest. He won a bronze medal in 50 metre rifle prone at the 1988 Summer Olympics in Seoul.

References

External links

1959 births
Living people
Sport shooters from Budapest
Hungarian male sport shooters
Olympic shooters of Hungary
Olympic bronze medalists for Hungary
Shooters at the 1988 Summer Olympics
Shooters at the 1992 Summer Olympics
20th-century Hungarian people